Out of Bounds (also known as Hors les murs) is a 2005 French documentary film directed by Alexandre Leborgne and Pierre Barougier.

Subject matter
Founded by the American colonial administration in 1904, The Iwahig prison on the island of Palawan in the Philippines is an open air penal colony covering 38,000 hectares of jungle and coastland.
After a probationary period, long-term prisoners are allowed to become farmers, fishermen or wardens, as the prison is self-supporting and self-managed.
The “lifers’” families organise their own community existence. Alejandro will soon be released. As “mayor” of the 2,300 prisoners, he acts as an experienced mentor for various inmates, such as Toting the fisherman or Rodrigo, a domestic that rebels against his boss, a violent warden. In the prison court, Alejandro acts as the prisoners’ lawyer, since he knows about everything that is going on. When he is finally released, he starts life all over again with his reconquered rights and a feeling of dignity.

Awards
 Grand Prix in 2006 at the EBS International Documentary Festival held by the national public television of Korea, EBS.
 Second prize at the Milano Film Festival in 2006
 Prix special du jury - Festival International du Film d'Environnement de Paris 2006

It was nominated for the French selection of Cinéma du Réel in 2006 and was selected in the following festivals:

Hot Docs 06 (Canada)
Visions du Réel film festival, Nyon, Switzerland
Festival Documenta Madrid (Spain)
Festival du film Insulaire de l’île de Groix (France)
Les Escales Documentaires de La Rochelle (France)
Reykjavík International Film Festival (Iceland)
Taiwan International Documentary Festival 2006. (Taiwan)
Internationales Film Festival Frankfurt (Germany)
Docsur, Tenerife (Spain)
Dokufest, Prizren (Kosovo)
Roma Independent Film FestivalRome
Nordic Anthropological Film Association Festival, Bergen (Norway)

See also
 EBS International Documentary Festival
 Iwahig Prison and Penal Farm

References

External links
 Centre Pompidou presentation of Out of Bounds 
 
 Cinéma du réel

2005 films
French documentary films
French independent films
Documentary films about the penal system
2005 documentary films
2000s English-language films
2000s French films